Gurayat Domestic Airport is an airport serving Gurayat (also spelled Guriat or Qurayyat), a city in Al Jawf Province, Saudi Arabia. It provides facilities for Saudia scheduled services to both Jeddah and Riyadh. The airport was established in 1974.

Facilities

Airlines and destinations

Airlines offering scheduled passenger service:

See also 

 List of airports in Saudi Arabia
 Saudia

References

External links
 
 
 

Airports in Saudi Arabia
Al-Jawf Province
1974 establishments in Saudi Arabia
Airports established in 1974